Translucence is the physical property of allowing light to pass through a material diffusely.

Translucence may also refer to:

 Social translucence, a concept in social information processing
 Translucence (John Foxx and Harold Budd album), a 2003 ambient album
 Translucence (Ply Styrene album), a 1981 post-punk album
 Venous translucence

Translucent may refer to:

 Translucent (manga)
 Translucent Flashbacks – The Singles, an album by Spacemen 3